Autostrada A13 is an Italian motorway which connects Bologna to Padua, passing through Ferrara and Rovigo. Near the two extremities of the track are situated two of the biggest Italian freight villages, in Bologna and Padua. Snow tyres are compulsory from 15 November to 15 April on the whole highway track, according to the Italian directives.

History
The first section of the motorway, from Bologna to Ferrara South, was opened to traffic on 22 December 1966.

On 10 August 1968 the segment from Ferrara South to Ferrara North was opened. On 7 August 1969 the section from Boara to Padua was inaugurated.

Furthermore, it was the first highway on which has been experimented foggy signage.

In 1964 it was proposed to lengthen the motorway from Padua to Treviso (another city in Veneto, Italy), and then up to Tarvisio (a small village along the borders between Italy, Austria, and Slovenia), but this was never done.

The highway today 
The track begins from the orbital road around Bologna, that connects the three important highways in Bologna: A13 towards Padua, A1 (Milan-Naples), A14 (Bologna-Taranto). The highway ends in Padua, at the junction with A4 (Turin-Trieste).

The whole way winds in the Pianura Padana and passes through Emilia-Romagna and Veneto. The only uplands in the surroundings are Colli Euganei, famous thermal area with Abano Terme in the middle. In fact, due to this kind of morphological features of the territory the highway crosses, during the winter-like seasons it is often present a great deal of fog, leading to a bad and reduced view.

Its management is assigned to the Italian society Autostrade per l'Italia.

By the exit Ferrara South there is a beltway leading to Porto Garibaldi, a town on the Adriatic Sea, whose first segment (between Ferrara South and the junction with state road SS16) is owned by Autostrade per l'Italia, while from this junction up to SS309 "Romea" it is owned by ANAS. Nowadays it is free, without any highway toll to be paid, even if in future the Government would be going to build toll booths in order to be accessible only after paying an amount.

Tutor 
This motorway has been chosen - along with A4 and A14 - to experiment new devices (called Safety Tutor) to measure vehicles average speed, working since 2005. Those are metal constructions built on the two sides of the highway and above it. The first tutor, heading Bologna, is situated just before the highway exit for Occhiobello. The second tutor, which calculates the average speed basing on the data collected by the previous one, is located just before the highway exit to Ferrara North, instead.

Track table

A13 Branch Padua South 
The branch to Padua South links the motorway A13, west of Padua, with the orbital road around Padua itself. The track is flat, with two lanes for each direction of traffic.

At first the branch used to make up the A13 ending segment. When the section which leads to A4 was built, the junction created was lacking: actually it was not possible neither getting that branch from A13 heading Bologna, nor getting A13 from the branch heading A4. In 2013 the construction site to build the complete interchange (with the remaining ramps) was opened; the work-in-progress finished in April 2017: the new beltway has been opened to traffic on 20 September 2017.

A13 Branch to Ferrara 
Then it proceeds heading toward Porto Garibaldi uninterruptedly as Beltway 8 for other 49 km.

It was opened to traffic on 22 December 1966.

This branch is internally-classified as D23 by Autostrade per l'Italia.

Furthermore, it is planned an extension (heading west) as far as Rolo-Reggiolo toll booth, on highway A22, realizing the "Autostrada regionale Cispadana" ("Cispadana regional Highway").

Notes 

A13
Buildings and structures completed in 1970
Transport in Emilia-Romagna
Transport in Veneto